84C MoPic (also known as 84 Charlie MoPic; released in the Philippines as Platoon 2) is a 1989 American independent found footage war drama film written and directed by Patrick Sheane Duncan.

Premise
The film is a mock documentary of a Long Range Reconnaissance Patrol (LRRP) mission during the Vietnam War. The point of view is from a cameraman following a LRRP team on a five-day patrol deep in "Indian Country" (territory controlled by the North Vietnamese). The cameraman is nicknamed "MoPic" by the team, because of his alphanumeric military occupational specialty, 84C20, Motion Picture Specialist. The supposedly routine mission, however, goes wrong and eventually turns into a struggle for survival. At first the squad seems in control. Their leader, the black sergeant “OD” detects booby traps, and the squad lays some booby traps of their own. They evade detection by an NVA patrol, and press deep behind enemy lines. One night, over the radio, they hear a whole army company being overrun by an NVA unit. They catch an NVA regiment in the open, and order an artillery strike, taking out much of the enemy.

Now that the NVA knows there are Americans nearby, they avoid any gunfire and make their escape in the bush as silently as possible. OD catches a 6 man NVA patrol on their tail, only 50 meters away. The squad takes them out, and carry a wounded NVA soldier with them. Their position is exposed by the noise, and a sniper takes out Pretty Boy. The sniper repeatedly shoots him in the limbs, torturing him, in an attempt to lure other squad members out into the open. Unable to rescue him, OD mercy kills him. He then demands the LT kill the NVA soldier with a knife to avoid any more noise. He sadistically makes the LT look at pictures of the NVA soldier’s family before LT kills the soldier. The squad continues their escape, but encounter VC troops which wound OD, and kill Cracker. With OD barely able to walk, Hammer, a less experienced squad member, takes point. He triggers a booby trap almost immediately, killing him. With half the squad killed, the survivors make their way to their evacuation point. After a final firefight, MOPIC is killed. OD, LT, and Easy escape in the chopper as the film ends.

Cast
 Jonathan Emerson as LT
 Nicholas Cascone as Easy
 Jason Tomlins as Pretty Boy
 Christopher Burgard as Hammer
 Glenn Morshower as Cracker
 Richard Brooks as OD
 Byron Thames as MoPic

Production and reception
84C MoPic was filmed on a low budget in Southern California. The film is one of the earlier examples of found footage, a style famously implemented by The Blair Witch Project and Paranormal Activity. 84 Charlie MoPic has an 83% "Fresh" rating on Rotten Tomatoes, based on 6 reviews. Roger Ebert, awarding the film three stars out of four, wrote

The film received three nominations:
 1989 Sundance Film Festival, Grand Jury Prize, Dramatic (Patrick Sheane Duncan)
 1990 Independent Spirit Award, Best First Feature, Patrick Sheane Duncan (Director); Michael Nolin (Producer)
 1990 Independent Spirit Award, Best Screenplay, Patrick Sheane Duncan

The film is listed among recommended Vietnam war films in a blog post on the Council on Foreign Relations.

References

External links
 
 AllMovie
 Trailer

1989 films
1980s war drama films
1989 crime drama films
American war drama films
Camcorder films
1980s English-language films
Found footage films
Vietnam War films
Vietnamese-language films
1980s American films